Shaodian was the father of Huangdi (黄帝), the Yellow Emperor according to the Records of the Grand Historian. He started the Youxiong clan (有熊氏), whilst Shaodian's wives were Fubao and Nüdeng of the Youjiao clan. Fubao later gave birth to Huangdi and Nüdeng(女登) gave birth to Yandi.

According to Discourses of the States, Shaodian was a stepfather of the Yellow Emperor:
"Shaodian's wife Fubao gave birth to the Yellow Emperor near the Ji River and the Yan Emperor next to the Jiang River which accounted to their different temperaments. Although Shaodian preceded the Yellow and Yan emperors, he was not their father."

Lady Hua, the wife of Ye the Great and mother of Fei the Great (also known as Boyi), was said to be either his daughter or descendant.

References

Legendary Chinese people
Characters in Chinese mythology